Dog-hole ports were the small, rural ports on the West Coast of the United States between Central California and Southern Oregon that operated between the mid-1800s until the 1930s. They were commonly called dog-holes because the schooners that served them would have to be able to "turn around in a harbor barely small enough for a dog".

The Pacific Coast
There were major American seaports between Canada and Mexico: Seattle, Washington; Portland, Oregon; San Francisco, Los Angeles, and San Diego, California.  Of the other ports on the Redwood Coast only Caspar, Crescent City, Humboldt, Noyo and Mendocino could serve as ports for the largest coastwise and small deepwater vessels.  Another 20 could hold medium-sized coasters.  The rest, commonly known as dog-holes, could only serve the smallest of the ships.

The Redwood Coast extended from San Simeon in California's Central coast to the Chetco River on Oregon's Southwestern coast. This coast is dominated by cliffs and bluffs uplifted from the ocean floor by waves and currents from marine terraces.  Since there are few rivers to create ports, the topography made it difficult to handle cargo. Usually, lumber schooners were the only connecters between the lumber ports and the major cities.  They brought all types of supplies to the ports and returned with boards, farm produce, and even livestock.  Most of the hulls were built on the Pacific Coast and towed to San Francisco loaded with cargo for finishing.

Loading the ships 
There were four major methods of loading ships at dog-holes: lightering, slide, apron or gravity chutes, wire or trapeze chutes, and wharfing.

At first shippers used lighters to ferry cargo out to anchored ships, but this was a slow process. By 1860 a gravity chute called an apron or slide chute was developed. It consisted of an A-frame on the bluff and an apron that could be adjusted to the height of the ships’ decks. A hinged gate covered with iron rode in the chute governed the speed of the wood. A primitive brake called a clapper provided additional control over the speed. It was a moveable plank tongue positioned on the outer end of the apron. It was the responsibility of the clapperman to regulate the speed by a lever. It was dangerous work; if the seaman slipped or the brakeman was slow, the lumber could kill or injure the crew member.

Mill operators generally built their lumber loading facilities on the lee (usually the south) side of a point.  This allowed the land to break the force of the waves and caused the direction of the swells to roll straight into the cove.  Schooners moored with their bows pointed directly into the waves so that they pitched (the ship going up and down along its long axis) but did not roll (going up and down along its crosswise axis).  This made loading easier.

Lumber Chutes
Mooring under a cliff to a buoy or by anchor, the ship would receive cargo down an apron chute or, later a wire chute.  It usually took two days to load.  All these ports were full of rocks both hidden and exposed.  There were undertows and cross-rip currents and continual changing sandbars.  The dog-hole operators obtained franchises to build and manage the chutes.  When a ship entered a port, it moored to a buoy (often a log anchored to the bottom) and would be warped or winched into position for loading.  A ship’s boat, crewed by three seamen and the second mate, carried the eight inch mooring lines to the buoy.  The gravity chutes were troughs allowing cargo to be sent down a cliff to a ship.  Besides bagged goods, the chutes were used to load other cargo, such as live hogs.

High-strength steel cable or wire became available in the 1870s. The wire chute was a big improvement over the gravity chutes.  They could load an entire sling of lumber at one time while the apron chutes could only load board by board.  The wires could be used to discharge, and load, cargo. Chutes were a West Coast innovation because of the high cliffs along the coast and the lack of harbors. Where prevailing weather conditions permitted, shippers built wharves allowing the ships to come alongside and load directly from the dock. The wire chutes permitted ships with deeper drafts to load since they did not need to approach so close to shore.  The wires continued in use until after World War I and were discontinued by the start of World War II.

References

External link
"Doghole ports" (NOAA Greater Farallones National Marine Sanctuary)

Other sources
Carranco, Lynwood; Labbe, John T (1975) Logging the Redwoods (Caxton Press)  
Carranco, Lynwood (1982) Redwood Lumber Industry (Golden West Books) 
Ryan, Terrence (Fall 2009) "The Pacific Coast Lumber Trade" in The California Territorial Quarterly (Paradise, California: Bill & Penny Anderson (79): 24–35. ISSN 1080-7594)
Ryan, Terrence (Fall 2010) "The Development of Pacific Coast Lumber Ship " in Nautical Research Journal (New York: Nautical Research Guild Inc.) 55 (3): 141–160) ISSN 0738-7245)
Ryan, Terrence (Spring 2012) "Pacific Coast Steam Schooners" in PowerShips (Cranston, R.I.: The Steamship Historical Society of America, Inc. (281): 38-45. ISSN 0039-0844)
Ryan, Terrence (March 2015) "The Redwood Fleet " in Sea Classics (North Hollywood, CA: Challenge Publications (Vol. 48, No. 3): 54-67. ISSN 0048-9867)

Related Reading
Haugan, Jevne (1999) Sailing with the Winds of History: A Pacific Coast Chronicle (AuthorHouse) 
Jackson, Walter A. (1969) The Doghole Schooners (Volcano, California: The California Traveler) 
Martin, Wallace E., compiler (1983) Sail & Steam on the Northern California Coast: 1850-1900 (San Francisco: National Maritime Museum Association in Cooperation with the Golden Gate National Recreation Area)
McNairn, Jack and Jerry MacMullen (1946) Ships of the Redwood Coast (Stanford: Stanford University Press) 
Newell, Gordon and Joe Williamson (1960) Pacific Lumber Ships (Seattle: Superior Publishing)

Ports and harbors of the United States
Ports and harbors of California
Maritime transport